Kushk (also Romanized as Kūshk and Keveshk; also known as Emām Şādeq) is a village in Kushk Rural District, Abezhdan District, Andika County, Khuzestan Province, Iran. At the 2006 census, its population was 262, in 56 families.

References 

Populated places in Andika County